Kahula is a village in Jõhvi Parish, Ida-Viru County in northeastern Estonia.

References

Villages in Ida-Viru County